The Central Park Historic District is located in Two Rivers, Wisconsin.

History
The district is old business district of Two Rivers, with notable buildings including the Greek Revival/Italianate Washington House Hotel built 1850/1870/1904, the 1880 Italianate Richter block, the 1889 Gothic Revival St. John's Lutheran Church, the 1899 Classical Revival Schroeder Block, the 1900 Civil War Soldiers' Monument, the 1905 Romanesque Revival Hamilton School, the 1906 Neoclassical Napieczinski saloon, the 1907 Queen Anne Stephany block, the 1925/37 Art Deco Beduhn/Goetz Furniture Store/funeral parlor, and the 1931 Tudor Revival Hamilton Community House. It includes works by Christ H. Tegen and Van Ryn & DeGelleke.

In 2000, it was added to the State and the National Register of Historic Places.

References

Historic districts on the National Register of Historic Places in Wisconsin
National Register of Historic Places in Manitowoc County, Wisconsin